The 2016–17 QMJHL season is the 48th season of the Quebec Major Junior Hockey League (QMJHL). The regular season began on September 22, 2016, and ended on March 18, 2017.

The playoffs began on March 23, 2017, and ended on May 10. The winning team, the Saint John Sea Dogs, were awarded the President's Cup and a berth in the 2017 Memorial Cup tournament, which was held at the WFCU Centre in Windsor, Ontario from May 19–28, 2017.

Regular season standings

Note: GP = Games played; W = Wins; L = Losses; OTL = Overtime losses; SL = Shootout losses; GF = Goals for; GA = Goals against; PTS = Points; x = clinched playoff berth; y = clinched division title

Scoring leaders
Note: GP = Games played; G = Goals; A = Assists; Pts = Points; PIM = Penalty minutes

Leading goaltenders
Note: GP = Games played; Mins = Minutes played; W = Wins; L = Losses: OTL = Overtime losses; SL = Shootout losses; GA = Goals Allowed; SO = Shutouts; GAA = Goals against average

2017 President's Cup playoffs

First round

(1) Saint John Sea Dogs vs. (16) Rimouski Océanic

(2) Rouyn-Noranda Huskies vs. (15) Halifax Mooseheads

(3) Shawinigan Cataractes vs. (14) Val-d'Or Foreurs

(4) Charlottetown Islanders vs. (13) Baie-Comeau Drakkar

(5) Blainville-Boisbriand Armada vs. (12) Drummondville Voltigeurs

(6) Acadie–Bathurst Titan vs. (11) Quebec Remparts

(7) Cape Breton Screaming Eagles vs. (10) Gatineau Olympiques

(8) Chicoutimi Saguenéens vs. (9) Victoriaville Tigres

Quarter-finals

(1) Saint John Sea Dogs vs. (14) Val-d'Or Foreurs

(2) Rouyn-Noranda Huskies vs. (8) Chicoutimi Saguenéens

(4) Charlottetown Islanders vs. (7) Cape Breton Screaming Eagles

(5) Blainville-Boisbriand Armada vs. (6) Acadie–Bathurst Titan

Semi-finals

(1) Saint John Sea Dogs vs. (8) Chicoutimi Saguenéens

(4) Charlottetown Islanders vs. (5) Blainville-Boisbriand Armada

President's Cup Finals

(1) Saint John Sea Dogs vs. (5) Blainville-Boisbriand Armada

Playoff leading scorers
Note: GP = Games played; G = Goals; A = Assists; Pts = Points; PIM = Penalty minutes

Playoff leading goaltenders

Note: GP = Games played; Mins = Minutes played; W = Wins; L = Losses: OTL = Overtime losses; SL = Shootout losses; GA = Goals Allowed; SO = Shutouts; GAA = Goals against average

Memorial Cup

Trophies and awards
President's Cup – Playoff Champions: Saint John Sea Dogs
Jean Rougeau Trophy – Regular Season Champions: Saint John Sea Dogs
Luc Robitaille Trophy – Team with the best goals for average: Charlottetown Islanders
Robert Lebel Trophy – Team with best GAA: Blainville-Boisbriand Armada

Player
Michel Brière Memorial Trophy – Most Valuable Player: Vitalii Abramov, Gatineau Olympiques
Jean Béliveau Trophy – Top Scorer: Vitalii Abramov, Gatineau Olympiques
Guy Lafleur Trophy – Playoff MVP: Thomas Chabot, Saint John Sea Dogs
Jacques Plante Memorial Trophy – Top Goaltender: Francis Leclerc, Blainville-Boisbriand Armada
Guy Carbonneau Trophy – Best Defensive Forward: Nicolas Roy, Chicoutimi Saguenéens
Emile Bouchard Trophy – Defenceman of the Year: Thomas Chabot, Saint John Sea Dogs
Kevin Lowe Trophy – Best Defensive Defenceman:  Zachary Lauzon, Rouyn-Noranda Huskies
Michael Bossy Trophy – Top Prospect: Nico Hischier, Halifax Mooseheads
RDS Cup – Rookie of the Year: Nico Hischier, Halifax Mooseheads
Michel Bergeron Trophy – Offensive Rookie of the Year: Nico Hischier, Halifax Mooseheads
Raymond Lagacé Trophy – Defensive Rookie of the Year: Jared McIsaac, Halifax Mooseheads
Frank J. Selke Memorial Trophy – Most sportsmanlike player: Hugo Roy, Sherbrooke Phoenix
QMJHL Humanitarian of the Year – Humanitarian of the Year: Samuel Labarge, Rimouski Océanic
Marcel Robert Trophy – Best Scholastic Player: Antoine Samuel, Baie-Comeau Drakkar
Paul Dumont Trophy – Personality of the Year: Thomas Chabot, Saint John Sea Dogs

Executive
Ron Lapointe Trophy – Coach of the Year: Danny Flynn, Saint John Sea Dogs
Maurice Filion Trophy – General Manager of the Year: Joël Bouchard, Blainville-Boisbriand Armada
John Horman Trophy – Executive of the Year: 
Jean Sawyer Trophy – Marketing Director of the Year:

All-Star Teams 
First All-Star Team:
 Mikhail Denisov, Goaltender, Shawinigan Cataractes
 Thomas Chabot, Defenceman, Saint John Sea Dogs
 Samuel Girard, Defenceman, Shawinigan Cataractes
 Nicolas Roy, Centre, Chicoutimi Saguenéens
 Giovanni Fiore, Left Wing, Cape Breton Screaming Eagles
 Vitalii Abramov, Right Wing, Gatineau Olympiques

Second All-Star Team:
 Samuel Montembeault, Goaltender, Blainville-Boisbriand Armada
 Guillaume Brisebois, Defenceman, Charlottetown Islanders
 Simon Bourque, Defenceman, Saint John Sea Dogs
 Filip Chlapik, Centre, Charlottetown Islanders
 Christophe Boivin, Left Wing, Acadie–Bathurst Titan
 Mathieu Joseph, Right Wing, Saint John Sea Dogs

All-Rookie Team:
 Alexis Gravel, Goaltender, Halifax Mooseheads
 Jared McIsaac, Defenceman, Halifax Mooseheads
 Xavier Bouchard, Defenceman, Baie-Comeau Drakkar
 Nico Hischier, Centre, Halifax Mooseheads
 Anderson Macdonald, Left Wing, Sherbrooke Phoenix
 Ivan Kosorenkov, Right Wing, Victoriaville Tigres

See also
 List of QMJHL seasons
 2016 in ice hockey
 2017 in ice hockey
 2016–17 OHL season
 2016–17 WHL season
 2017 Memorial Cup

References

External links
 Official QMJHL website
 Official CHL website
 Official website of the Subway Super Series

Quebec Major Junior Hockey League seasons
Qmjhl